The San Diego Buds were a team tennis franchise in TeamTennis. The team was founded in 1981, as the San Diego Friars, a namesake of the original team that played in World Team Tennis from 1975 through 1978. The Buds were owned by Dr. Phil Young. The team changed its name before the 1984 season. The Buds played their home matches at the San Diego Sports Arena. The Buds won the 1984 and 1985 TeamTennis championships before folding following the 1985 season.

World Team Tennis suspended operations after the 1978 season, and all the franchises were terminated. The league restarted in 1981, under the new name TeamTennis with four new expansion franchises one of which was the new Friars. Each team owner paid a US$75,000 franchise fee to start a new team.

See also

 San Diego Friars (1975–1978)

References

Defunct World TeamTennis teams
Sports clubs established in 1981
Tennis teams in San Diego
Tennis in California
Sports clubs disestablished in 1985
1981 establishments in California
1985 disestablishments in California